Ptychadena grandisonae is a species of frog in the family Ptychadenidae.
It is found in Angola, Democratic Republic of the Congo, Rwanda, Tanzania, Zambia, and possibly Burundi.
Its natural habitats are moist savanna, subtropical or tropical seasonally wet or flooded lowland grassland, subtropical or tropical high-altitude grassland, and swamps.

References

Ptychadena
Taxa named by Raymond Laurent
Amphibians described in 1954
Taxonomy articles created by Polbot